Mametz may refer to:
 Mametz, Pas-de-Calais, France
 Mametz, Somme, France